Eumerus tuberculatus,  the lesser bulb fly (a common name shared by several species of this genus) is a species of hoverfly from the family Syrphidae, in the order Diptera. It is a pest that destroys the bulbs of Narcissus.

References

Further reading 
 CREAGER, D. B.; SPRUIJT, F. J. THE RELATION OF CERTAIN FUNGI TO LARVAL DEVELOPMENT OF EUMERUS TUBERCULATUS ROND. (Syrphidae, Diptera). Annals of the Entomological Society of America, Volume 28, Number 4, December 1935, pp. 425-437(13)
 W. E. H. Hodson. The Bionomics of the Lesser Bulb Flies, Eumerus strigatus, Flyn., and Eumerus tuberculatus, Rond., in South–west England. Bulletin of Entomological Research. Volume 17 Issue 04 June 1927 pp 373-384

Insects described in 1857
Eristalinae
Eumerini
Diptera of Europe
Taxa named by Camillo Rondani